The Masonic Temple in Lewistown, Montana, also known as the Lewistown Lodge No. 37 A.F. & A.M., is a building from 1908. It was listed on the National Register of Historic Places in 1979.

It is a standalone three-story building, with basement, at the corner of Fourth Avenue North and West Broadway Street in Lewistown.  Up to the ceremonial placement of the building's cornerstone on August 20, 1908, almost all of the stonecutters, masons, and others involved with its construction had come from the nation of Croatia, including Peter Tuss, the stonemason who was the contractor for the building's construction.

References

Clubhouses on the National Register of Historic Places in Montana
Neoclassical architecture in Montana
Masonic buildings completed in 1908
Masonic buildings in Montana
National Register of Historic Places in Fergus County, Montana
1908 establishments in Montana
Croatian-American history